Diego de Miguel Escribano (born 1 September 1984) is a Spanish footballer who plays as a goalkeeper.

Club career
Born in Soria, Castile and León, de Miguel's career was spent almost exclusively in the lower leagues of Spanish football. Late into the 2004–05 season, as CD Numancia were already relegated, he appeared in two La Liga home matches, against CA Osasuna (2–2) and Deportivo de La Coruña (1–1). 

During his spell with the club, de Miguel was mostly registered with the reserve team.

References

External links

1984 births
Living people
People from Soria
Sportspeople from the Province of Soria
Spanish footballers
Footballers from Castile and León
Association football goalkeepers
La Liga players
Segunda División players
Segunda División B players
Tercera División players
CD Numancia B players
CD Numancia players
CE Sabadell FC footballers
CD Izarra footballers
CF Palencia footballers